The 2007 Asian Men's Club Volleyball Championship was the 8th staging of the AVC Club Championships. The tournament was held in Manama, bahrain. Paykan of Iran won the tournament after beating Al-Hilal of Saudi Arabia.

Pools composition
The teams are seeded based on their final ranking at the 2006 Asian Men's Club Volleyball Championship.

Preliminary round

Pool A

|}

|}

Pool B

|}

|}

Classification 9th–12th

Semifinals

|}

11th place

|}

9th place

|}

Classification 5th–8th

Semifinals

|}

7th place

|}

5th place

|}

Final round

Semifinals

|}

3rd place

|}

Final

|}

Final standing

Awards
MVP:  Mohammad Soleimani (Paykan)
Best Scorer:  Peyman Akbari (Paykan)
Best Server:  Mohammad Torkashvand (Paykan)
Best Spiker:  Jumaa Faraj (Al-Arabi)
Best Blocker:  Mohammad Mousavi (Paykan)
Best Libero:  Farhad Zarif (Paykan)
Best Setter:  Khalil Hajji (Al-Hilal)
Best Digger:  Ahmed Al-Bakhit (Al-Hilal)

References
Asian Volleyball Confederation
Goalzz

2007 Asian Men's Club Volleyball Championship
International volleyball competitions hosted by Bahrain
A
Asian Mens Club Volleyball Championship, 2007